In Greek mythology, Gelos (Ancient Greek: Γέλως) was the divine personification of laughter. According to Philostratus the Elder, he was believed to enter the retinue of Dionysus alongside Comus. Plutarch relates that Lycurgus of Sparta dedicated a small statue of Gelos to the god, and elsewhere, mentions that in Sparta there was a sanctuary of Gelos, as well as those of Thanatos, Phobos "and other [personifications of] experiences of this kind".

Risus was the Latin rendition of the name Gelos. A festival in honor of Risus (i. e. Gelos) in Thessaly was described by Apuleius, but it is unknown whether it was an actual event or writer's invention.

Notes

References 

 Philostratus the Elder. Imagines, translated by Arthur Fairbanks (1864-1944). Loeb Classical Library Volume 256. London: William Heinemann, 1931. Online version at the Topos Text Project.
 Philostratus the Lemnian (Philostratus Major), Flavii Philostrati Opera. Vol 2. Carl Ludwig Kayser. in aedibus B. G. Teubneri. Lipsiae. 1871. Greek text available at the Perseus Digital Library.

Greek gods
Personifications in Greek mythology
Laconian mythology
Laughter